Mount Bosnek is the ice-covered peak rising to  in the west part of Voden Heights on Oscar II Coast in Graham Land.  It is situated between two southeastwards flowing tributaries to Fleece Glacier.  The feature is named after the settlement of Bosnek in Western Bulgaria.

Location
British mapping in 1976.

Maps

 British Antarctic Territory.  Scale 1:200000 topographic map.  DOS 610 Series, Sheet W 65 62.  Directorate of Overseas Surveys, Tolworth, UK, 1976.
 Antarctic Digital Database (ADD). Scale 1:250000 topographic map of Antarctica. Scientific Committee on Antarctic Research (SCAR). Since 1993, regularly upgraded and updated.

Notes

References
 Mount Bosnek. SCAR Composite Antarctic Gazetteer.
 Bulgarian Antarctic Gazetteer. Antarctic Place-names Commission. (details in Bulgarian, basic data in English)

External links
 Mount Bosnek. Copernix satellite image

Bosnek
Oscar II Coast
Bulgaria and the Antarctic